Emperor of the Daleks is a black-and-white comic strip based on the television series Doctor Who. It ran primarily in the pages of Doctor Who Magazine, written by John Freeman and novelist and future television series writer Paul Cornell. The story used elements of previous television continuity, as well as the continuity used by the comic strip, reviving popular characters such as "Dalek Killer" Abslom Daak and the Star Tigers. It also attempted to bridge the gap between Revelation of the Daleks and Remembrance of the Daleks.

Plot

On the Daleks' homeworld of Skaro, the Daleks place their creator Davros on trial for crimes against their race. Coming to his aid is the sixth incarnation of Davros' eternal enemy the Doctor, who offers to take Davros to a planet where he can create new lifeforms for good if he is willing to change; Davros agrees. During the rescue, the Doctor makes a sly reference to the Hand of Omega.

Incensed with yet another humiliating delay at the hands of the Doctor, the Emperor Dalek makes use of his empire's delicate time-travel capabilities to snatch Abslom Daak from the brink of death, and pose as humanoid delegates of Earth. They deceive Daak and offer a way of reviving his long-lost love Taiyan in exchange for the capture of the Doctor. Daak agrees.

The TARDIS materialises on the planet "Hell", a world the Doctor had visited earlier in his seventh incarnation in Daak's previous appearance, Nemesis of the Daleks. The Doctor is now accompanied by Bernice Summerfield, and it is not long before the two discover that Daak's former team the "Star Tigers" are alive and well, having been presumed dead when their vessel crashed in the previous story. Drunk and downbeat, the Tigers are ill-prepared for the return of Daak, who soon captures the Doctor and Benny, as well as his old teammates, and returns all of them to the "Earth Delegates", who reveal themselves as Daleks and capture all of them.

The Doctor agrees to take the Daleks to the planet where he has hidden Davros, but both groups discover that the world was Spiridon. Davros has activated the long-dormant Dalek army hidden there, converting them to the white and gold colour scheme applied to the Daleks he created on the planet Necros in Revelation of the Daleks. Davros leads a successful coup d'état on Skaro, destroying the Emperor Dalek, but his wheelchair is split in half by Abslom Daak's chainsword, triggering his self-destruct mechanism which seemingly obliterates the Dalek city. The Doctor, Benny, the Star Tigers, and Daak escape the city in the TARDIS.

Shortly afterwards, the Seventh Doctor meets up with his sixth incarnation at a bar as his group of friends celebrate. He assures the Sixth Doctor that time will show him that Davros will doom him and Skaro to oblivion.

Back on Skaro, Davros' body is pieced together by his loyal Dalek forces with a new casing, they inform Davros he has claimed the mantle of "Emperor". Much of Davros' memory has been affected by the explosion, but as he regains his composure, he recalls the Doctor referencing the Hand of Omega, and vows to find it when he faces the Doctor in what he believes will be their next and possibly final confrontation.

Continuity
Davros and the Sixth Doctor's experiences following their departure from Skaro is explored further in a prequel strip, "Up Above The Gods", published several months after this story had concluded.

Reprint
The entire story was reprinted in a graphic novel, also entitled Emperor of the Daleks in 2017(IMDB:978-1846538070).

See also
Dalek comic strips, illustrated annuals and graphic novels

References

External links

Emperor of the Daleks at the Dr Who Guide

British comic strips
Dalek stories
Sixth Doctor stories
Seventh Doctor stories
Doctor Who multi-Doctor stories
Works by Paul Cornell